Stefan Kovač (born 14 January 1999) is a Bosnian professional footballer who plays as a midfielder for Serbian SuperLiga club Čukarički.

Kovač started his professional career at Čukarički.

Club career

Early career
Kovač came through youth academy of his hometown club Red Star Belgrade, which he left in January 2019 to join Čukarički. He made his professional debut against Voždovac on 24 February at the age of 20. On 1 May, he scored a brace in a triumph over Napredak Kruševac, which were his first professional goals.

International career
Kovač represented Bosnia and Herzegovina at all youth levels.

Career statistics

Club

References

External links

1999 births
Living people
Footballers from Belgrade
Serbian people of Bosnia and Herzegovina descent
Citizens of Bosnia and Herzegovina through descent
Bosnia and Herzegovina footballers
Bosnia and Herzegovina youth international footballers
Bosnia and Herzegovina under-21 international footballers
Bosnia and Herzegovina expatriate footballers
Association football midfielders
FK Čukarički players
Serbian SuperLiga players
Bosnia and Herzegovina expatriate sportspeople in Serbia